The 2021 Dixie Vodka 400 was a NASCAR Cup Series race that was held on February 28, 2021 at Homestead-Miami Speedway in Homestead, Florida. Contested over 267 laps on the 1.5 mile (2.4 km) oval, it was the third race of the 2021 NASCAR Cup Series season.

Report

Background

Homestead-Miami Speedway is a motor racing track located in Homestead, Florida. The track, which has several configurations, has promoted several series of racing, including NASCAR, the NTT IndyCar Series and the Grand-Am Rolex Sports Car Series

From 2002 to 2019, Homestead-Miami Speedway has hosted the final race of the season in all three of NASCAR's series: the NASCAR Cup Series, Xfinity Series and Camping World Truck Series.

Entry list
 (R) denotes rookie driver.
 (i) denotes driver who are ineligible for series driver points.

Qualifying
Denny Hamlin was awarded the pole for the race as determined by competition-based formula.

Starting Lineup

Race
William Byron took his second Cup Series win, driving a Chevrolet for the Hendrick Motorsports team. Tyler Reddick overtook other drivers after sunset and finished in second. Martin Truex Jr. finished third after he made a pit stop for new tires at the end of the second stage. Kyle Larson had his best result in nearly a year by finishing fourth. Kevin Harvick finished fifth, which was the best result for a Ford driver. Michael McDowell took his third top ten finish in a row by coming sixth. Ryan Newman was seventh, while the two Busch brothers finished eighth and tenth to sandwich ninth-placed Alex Bowman. Kurt Busch recovered to eighth after losing positions to a loose wheel.

Stage Results

Stage One
Laps: 80

Stage Two
Laps: 80

Final Stage Results

Stage Three
Laps: 107

Race statistics
 Lead changes: 20 among 9 different drivers
 Cautions/Laps: 6 for 36
 Red flags: 0
 Time of race: 3 hours, 12 minutes and 45 seconds
 Average speed:

Media

Television
The Dixie Vodka 400 was carried by Fox in the United States. Mike Joy, 2012 Homestead winner Jeff Gordon and Clint Bowyer called the race from the broadcast booth. Jamie Little and Regan Smith handled pit road for the television side. Larry McReynolds provided insight from the Fox Sports studio in Charlotte.

Radio
MRN had the radio call for the race, which was also simulcast on Sirius XM NASCAR Radio. Alex Hayden and Jeff Striegle called the action of the race for MRN when the field raced down the front straightaway. Dave Moody covered the action for MRN in turns 1 & 2, and Mike Bagley had the call of the action from turns 3 & 4. Steve Post and Kim Coon covered the action of the race for MRN on pit road.

Standings after the race

Drivers' Championship standings

Manufacturers' Championship standings

Note: Only the first 16 positions are included for the driver standings.

References

Dixie Vodka 400
Dixie Vodka 400
Dixie Vodka 400
NASCAR races at Homestead-Miami Speedway